Courthouse Square Historic District is a national historic district located at Bloomington, Monroe County, Indiana.  The district encompasses 57 contributing buildings in the central business district of Bloomington.  It developed between about 1847 and 1936, and includes notable examples of Classical Revival, Beaux Arts and Italianate style architecture.  Located in the district are the separately listed Bloomington City Hall, Monroe County Courthouse, Princess Theatre, and Wicks Building. Other notable buildings include the Federal Building (c. 1912), Masonic Temple, former Faulkner Hotel (c. 1847), Odd Fellows Building (1892), Allen Building (1907), First National Bank Building (1907), Knights of Pythias Building (1907), and Graham Hotel Building.

It was listed on the National Register of Historic Places in 1990.

Gallery

References

Historic districts on the National Register of Historic Places in Indiana
Italianate architecture in Indiana
Neoclassical architecture in Indiana
Beaux-Arts architecture in Indiana
Buildings and structures in Bloomington, Indiana
Historic districts in Monroe County, Indiana
National Register of Historic Places in Monroe County, Indiana
Courthouses on the National Register of Historic Places in Indiana